The 28th European Men's Artistic Gymnastics Championships held from 8 May to 11 May 2008 in Lausanne.

Oldest and youngest competitors

Country represented

Medallists

Senior Results

Team Competition 

Oldest and youngest competitors

Floor 

Oldest and youngest competitors

Pommel horse 

Oldest and youngest competitors

Still rings 

Oldest and youngest competitors

Vault 

Oldest and youngest competitors

Parallel bars 

Oldest and youngest competitors

Horizontal bar 

Oldest and youngest competitors

Junior Results

Team Competition

The junior team competition also served as the individual all-around and qualification to the individual event finals.

Floor exercise

Pommel horse

Still rings

Vault

Parallel bars

Horizontal bar

Medal count

Combined

Seniors

Juniors

External links
 

2008
European Men's Artistic Gymnastics Championships
International gymnastics competitions hosted by Switzerland
2008 in European sport
Sports competitions in Lausanne
2008 in Swiss sport